Cashibo, Caxibo or Kashibo may refer to:
Cashibo people, an indigenous people of Peru
Cashibo language, the language of the Cashibo people
Cashibo (mission), a Christian mission in Peru